The Network of Universities from the Capitals of Europe (UNICA) is a network of 54 universities, gathering major higher education institutions in 38 European capital cities, which has a combined strength of over 180,000 university staff and 2.000,000 students. It was founded in 1990 on the initiative of the Université libre de Bruxelles. The mission of the network is to promote academic excellence, integration and cooperation among its member universities throughout Europe. It also seeks to be a driving force in the development of the Bologna process and to facilitate the integration of universities from Central and Eastern Europe into the European Higher Education Area. The office of the network is located in the University Foundation in Brussels. In 2022, the organization suspended the three Russian universities because of Russia's war in Ukraine and the support of the rectors to Vladimir Putin's policies.

UNICA member universities

References

External links 
 

College and university associations and consortia in Europe